Dowdar (also Romanized as Dū Dar, Dodar, Do Dar; also known as Do Darān, Dow Darān) is a village in Bemani Rural District, Byaban District, Minab County, Hormozgan Province, Iran. At the 2006 census, its population was 466, in 85 families.

References 

Populated places in Minab County